Missing Links and Secret Histories: A Selection of Wikipedia Entries from Across the Known Multiverse is a 2013 collection of short stories in the form of fictitious Wikipedia entries. The speculative fiction anthology was edited by L. Timmel Duchamp. The collection was published by Aqueduct Press, who issued a call for materials in 2011 asking writers to create "wikipedia-page-style entries".

References

Further reading
Mertz, Erick (September 19, 2013) SCIENCE FICTION BOOK REVIEW – “Missing Links & Secret Histories” Erick Mertz Writing.
Gamaliel (January 22, 2014) "Book Review: Missing Links and Secret Histories: A Selection of Wikipedia Entries from Across the Known Multiverse" The Signpost.

2013 anthologies
Parodies of Wikipedia
Speculative fiction short stories